Paracymoriza is a genus of moths of the family Crambidae.

Species
albifascialis species group
Paracymoriza albalis Yoshiyasu, 1987
Paracymoriza albifascialis Hampson, 1891
Paracymoriza phlegetonalis (Snellen, 1895)
Paracymoriza stigmatalis (Swinhoe, 1894)
distinctalis species group
Paracymoriza bleszynskialis Roesler & Speidel, 1981
Paracymoriza distinctalis (Leech, 1889)
Paracymoriza taiwanalis (Wileman & South, 1917)
eromenalis species group
Paracymoriza eromenalis (Snellen, 1880)
Paracymoriza parallelalis Sauber in Semper, 1902
laminalis species group
Paracymoriza laminalis (Hampson in Leech & South, 1901)
Paracymoriza reductalis (Caradja, 1925)
nigra species group
Paracymoriza latifascialis (Warren, 1896)
Paracymoriza flavicaput (Snellen, 1901)
Paracymoriza nigra (Warren, 1896)
prodigalis species group
Paracymoriza cataclystalis (Strand, 1919)
Paracymoriza fuscalis (Yoshiyasu, 1985)
Paracymoriza okinawanus (Yoshiyasu & Arita, 1992)
Paracymoriza prodigalis (Leech, 1889)
Paracymoriza yuennanensis (Caradja in Caradja & Meyrick, 1937)
vagalis species group
Paracymoriza aurantialis Swinhoe, 1895
Paracymoriza immanis (Hampson, 1906)
Paracymoriza inextricata (Moore, 1888)
Paracymoriza olivalis Hampson, 1891
Paracymoriza rivularis (Moore, 1888)
Paracymoriza vagalis (Walker, 1866)
unknown species group
Paracymoriza albimaculata F.Q. Chen, S.M. Song & C.S. Wu, 2007
Paracymoriza argenteolineata Speidel, 2003
Paracymoriza concava F.Q. Chen, S.M. Song & C.S. Wu, 2007
Paracymoriza convallata You & Li in You & Li, 2005
Paracymoriza ectargyralis (Hampson, 1897)
Paracymoriza fuliginosa Speidel, 2003
Paracymoriza gangeticalis (Lederer, 1863)
Paracymoriza loricatalis (Lederer, 1863)
Paracymoriza multispinea You, Wang & Li in You, Wang, Li & Chen, 2003
Paracymoriza naumanniella Speidel, Buchsbaum & Miller, 2005
Paracymoriza nigrella Speidel, 2003
Paracymoriza oxygona (Meyrick, 1894)
Paracymoriza pseudovagalis F.Q. Chen, S.M. Song & C.S. Wu, 2007
Paracymoriza scotalis (Hampson, 1906)
Paracymoriza truncata F.Q. Chen, S.M. Song & C.S. Wu, 2007

References

 , 2007: A review of the genus Paracymoriza Warren in China (Lepidoptera: Crambidae: Acentropinae). Aquatic Insects 29 (4): 263-283 
 , 1981: Paracymoriza bleszynskialis n. sp., eine neue Acentropine aus China (Lepidoptera - Pyraloidea - Acentropinae). Articulata 18: 201–206.
  2003: New species of Aquatic moths from the Philippines (Lepidoptera: Crambidae). Insecta Koreana 20 (1): 7-49.
 , 1999: Catalogue of the Oriental Acentropinae (Lepidoptera: Crambidae). Tijdschrift voor Entomologie 142 (1): 125–142. Full article: .
 , 1987: The Nymphulinae (Lepidoptera: Pyralidae) from Thailand, with descriptions of a new genus and six new species. Microlepidoptera of Thailand 1: 133–184.
 , 2003: Genus Paracymoriza Warren from China (Lepidoptera: Crambidae: Nymphulinae). Aquatic Insects 25 (3): 211–217.

External links

Acentropinae
Crambidae genera
Taxa named by William Warren (entomologist)